The Antihydrogen Laser Physics Apparatus (ALPHA), also known as AD-5, is an experiment at the Antiproton Decelerator at CERN,  designed to trap neutral antihydrogen in a magnetic trap, and conduct experiments on them. The ultimate goal of this experiment is to test CPT symmetry through comparison of the atomic spectra of hydrogen and antihydrogen (see hydrogen spectral series). The ALPHA collaboration consists of some former members of the ATHENA collaboration or AD-1 experiment (the first group to produce cold antihydrogen, in 2002), as well as a number of new members.


Experimental setup
ALPHA faces several challenges. Magnetic traps – wherein neutral atoms are trapped using their magnetic moments – are notoriously weak; only atoms with kinetic energies equivalent to less than one kelvin may be trapped. The cold antihydrogen created first in 2002 by the ATHENA and the ATRAP collaborations (AD-2) was produced by merging cold plasmas of positrons (also called antielectrons) and antiprotons. While this method has been quite successful, it creates anti-atoms with kinetic energies too large to be trapped. Furthermore, to do laser spectroscopy on these anti-atoms, it is important that they are in their ground state, something which does not seem to be the case for the majority of the anti-atoms created thus far.

Antiprotons are received from the Antiproton Decelerator and are 'mixed' with positrons from a specially-designed positron accumulator in a versatile Penning trap. The central region where the mixing and thus antihydrogen formation takes place is surrounded by a superconducting octupole magnet and two axially separated short solenoids "mirror-coils" to form a "minimum-B" magnetic trap. Once trapped antihydrogen can be subjected to detailed study and be compared to hydrogen.

Antihydrogen detection 
In order to detect trapped antihydrogen atoms ALPHA also comprises a silicon vertex detector. This cylindrically shaped detector consists of three layers of silicon panels (strips). Each panel acts as a position sensitive detector for charged particles passing through. By recording how the panels are excited ALPHA can reconstruct the tracks of charged particles traveling through their detector. When an antiproton annihilates (disintegrates) the process typically results in the emission of 3–4 charged pions. These can be observed by the ALPHA detector and by reconstructing their tracks through the detector their origin, and thus the location of the annihilation, can be determined. These tracks are quite distinct from the tracks of cosmic rays which are also detected but are of high energy and pass straight through the detector. By carefully analyzing the tracks ALPHA distinguishes between cosmic rays and antiproton annihilation.

To detect successful trapping the ALPHA trap magnet that created the minimum B-field was designed to allow it to be quickly and repeatedly de-energized. The currents' decay during de-energization has a characteristic time of 9 ms, orders of magnitude faster than similar systems. This fast turn-off and the ability to suppress false signal from cosmic rays should allow ALPHA to detect the release of even a single trapped antihydrogen atom during de-energization of the trap.

Cooling antihydrogen 
In order to make antihydrogen cold enough to be trapped the ALPHA collaboration has implemented a novel technique, well known from atomic physics, called evaporative cooling. The motivation for this is that one of the main challenges of trapping antihydrogen is to make it cold enough. State-of-the art minimum-B traps like the one ALPHA comprises have depths in temperature units of order one Kelvin. As no readily available techniques exist to cool antihydrogen, the constituents must be cold and kept cold for the formation. Antiprotons and positrons are not easily cooled to cryogenic temperatures and the implementation of evaporative cooling is thus an important step towards antihydrogen trapping.

ALPHA physics 
ALPHA is presently studying the gravitational properties of antimatter. A preliminary experiment in 2013 found that the gravitational mass of antihydrogen atoms was between −65 and 110 times their inertial mass, leaving considerable room for refinement using larger numbers of colder antihydrogen atoms.

ALPHA has succeeded to cool down antihydrogen atoms using laser light, a technique, known as laser cooling, which was first demonstrated in 1978 on normal matter.

ALPHA collaboration 
The ALPHA collaboration comprises the following institutions:

References

External Links 
Record for ALPHA experiment on INSPIRE-HEP 
CERN experiments
Particle experiments
Antimatter